The Skodje Bridge is a bridge that crosses the Skodjestraumen in Ålesund Municipality in Møre og Romsdal county, Norway.

There are actually three bridges over Skodjestraumen. The newest bridge is called the Straum Bridge. It was opened on 3 July 2004. It replaced the old Skodje Bridge. This new bridge is a toll bridge.

Old bridges

The two old Skodje Bridges are also arch bridges, the longest masonry arch road bridge in Norway. The building of the old bridges started in 1911 and were opened in 1922. They cost .

The old bridges still stand, but are not in a good shape. For the last few years before the new bridge was opened, the old bridges had restrictions on the weight and width of the cars that crossed it, and that meant that heavier traffic had to take a longer road through the village of Skodje. This was of course very impractical. With the new bridge in operation, the old bridges are now open only for pedestrians.

History
On 10 August 1880, two teachers wrote to the local council, requesting a road, going from the main road by Svortavatnet, to the Vatne lake, with a bridge over Straumen. It was not until 1909 that the local council agreed to pay  to start the work on the bridge. Chief engineer Hovdenakk, from the Public Roads Administration office in Molde, constructed and led the work on the bridge.

Gallery

Photographs
 New Bridge
 Old Bridge

See also
 List of bridges in Norway
 List of bridges in Norway by length
 List of bridges
 List of bridges by length
 List of longest masonry arch bridge spans

References

External links
Official website

Bridges in Møre og Romsdal
Bridges completed in 2004
Bridges completed in 1922
Toll bridges in Norway
Ålesund